Robert Dankoff is Professor Emeritus of Ottoman & Turkish Studies, Department of Near Eastern Languages and Civilizations at University of Chicago

Robert Dankoff was born on 24 September 1943 in Rochester, New York. In 1964, he received a Bachelor of Arts degree from Columbia University, and in 1971 got a Ph.D. from Harvard. He taught Arabic at Brandeis University as an assistant professor in 1969-1975. He taught Turkish in University of California (1976-77), and University of Arizona (1977-1979). He joined the Department of Near Eastern Languages and Civilizations at Chicago University in 1979 as an Assistant Professor, where he became an Associate Professor in 1982, and a Professor in 1987. He taught  Turkish, Old Turkish, Ottoman Turkish, Azeri, and Uzbek there until retiring in 2006. 

His research interests lie in Ottoman Literature and Turcology. He has published extensively on Turkish texts from Central Asia and the Ottoman Empire, including text editions and translations of portions of the Seyahatname of Evliya Çelebi.

Honors 

 Order of Merit of the Republic of Turkey, 20 October 2008
 Honorary doctorate from Çanakkale Onsekiz Mart University, 2021

Publications 

 An Ottoman Traveller: Selections from the book of Travels by Evliya Çelebi. Eland Publishing, 2011. ISBN 1906011583
 Ottoman Explorations of the Nile: Evliya Çelebi's Map of the Nile and The Nile Journeys in the Book of Travels (Seyahatname). Gingko Library, 2018. ISBN 1909942162
 From Mahmud Kasgari to Evliya Celebi Studies in Middle Turkic and Ottoman Literatures. Gorgias Press, Piscataway, NJ, 2009. ISBN 9781463216931
 An Ottoman Mentality: The World of Evliya Çelebi (Ottoman Empire and Its Heritage, v. 31) (No. 31) (Brill Academic Publishing, 2004) ISBN 978-9004137158
 Armenian Loanwords in Turkish (Harrassowitz, 1995)
 The Intimate Life of an Ottoman Statesman, Melek Ahmed Pasha, (1588-1662: As Portrayed in Evliya Çelebi's Book of Travels. SUNY Press, 1991. ISBN 978-0791406410
 Wisdom of Royal Glory (Kutadgu Bilig): A Turko-Islamic Mirror for Princes by Yusuf Khass Hajib (Publications of the Center for Middle Eastern Studies, 1983)

References 

American Turkologists
1943 births
Living people
Columbia University alumni
Harvard University alumni
Brandeis University faculty
University of California, Berkeley faculty
University of Arizona faculty
University of Chicago faculty